Speed skating at the 1996 Winter Asian Games took place in Heilongjiang Indoor Rink Harbin-Nangang in the city of Harbin, China with nine events contested — five for men and four for women. The events were scheduled for February 5– February 9, 1996.

Schedule

Medalists

Men

Women

Medal table

Participating nations
A total of 53 athletes from 5 nations competed in speed skating at the 1996 Asian Winter Games:

References
 
 Results

 
1996 Asian Winter Games events
1996
Asian Games
Asian Games